The National Museum of Mexican Art (NMMA), formerly known as the Mexican Fine Arts Center Museum, is a museum featuring Mexican, Latino, and Chicano art and culture. It is located in Harrison Park in the Pilsen neighborhood of Chicago, Illinois. The museum was founded in 1982 by Carlos Tortolero and opened on March 27, 1987. It is the only Latino museum accredited by the American Alliance of Museums. The museum describes itself as the largest Latino cultural institution in America.

Admission to the museum is free.

History
Carlos Tortolero and a group of Mexican-American teachers first formed the Mexican Fine Arts Center Museum in 1982. The museum building in Harrison Park opened in 1987 and was expanded in 2001. The design on the façade of the building was inspired by the friezes of Mitla in Oaxaca, Mexico.

The name of the museum was changed to the National Museum of Mexican Art in December 2006. This name change reflects the status of the museum as the only member of the American Alliance of Museums dedicated to Latino culture.

Collections
The museum has a permanent collection featuring prominent works by Mexican artists and artifacts from Mexican history. The permanent exhibit "Mexicanidad: Our Past is Present" explores the history of Mexico in five stages: Pre-Cuauhtémoc Mexico, Colonial Mexico, Mexico from Independence to Revolution, Post-Mexican Revolution to Present-day Mexico and The Mexican Experience in the US.

Annual Día de los Muertos exhibit
Every October, the museum has a Día de los Muertos ("Day of the Dead") exhibit which features altars and Día de los Muertos-related art by Chicago-area and international artists. This exhibit is the nation's largest.

Other initiatives
The National museum of art also has a program of arts education, performance and community initiatives. In 1994, the museum created two new festivals, Del Corazon: the Mexican Performing Arts Festival and the Sor Juana Festival, dedicated to an important Mexicana scholar. In 1997, the museum created the Yollocalli Arts Reach.

The NMMA also ran the radio station WRTE 90.5 FM, Radio Arte, a non-profit, community station from late 1996 to December 30, 2012.  In Spring 2011, the museum announced that the radio station and the building it has been in since the late 1990s had been put up for sale due to financial issues. On June 22, 2012, it was announced that Chicago Public Media had purchased the license of WRTE FM pending FCC approval thus ending NMMA's 15 years of ownership and on December 31, 2012, Chicago Public Media took control of the frequency after FCC approval thus ending its stint as the only Latino owned broadcast station of any kind in the immediate Chicago area.

See also
 
 Radio Arte - WRTE
 Pilsen, Chicago
 List of museums and cultural institutions in Chicago
 Mexicans in Chicago

References

External links

Lower West Side, Chicago
Mexican-American culture in Chicago
Art museums and galleries in Illinois
Art museums and galleries in Chicago
Ethnic museums in Illinois
Latino museums in the United States
Hispanic and Latino American culture in Chicago
Art museums established in 1982
1982 establishments in Illinois
Inductees of the Chicago LGBT Hall of Fame